Off Their Rockers is an Australian comedy television series aired on The Comedy Channel on 13 January 2013 until 3 March 2013. It is based on the U.S. version titled Betty White's Off Their Rockers. The original format however is from a Belgian television show 'Benidorm Bastards', broadcast by 2BE. The title music used in the international versions is still the original score written by Tim Van Aelst.

The Comedy Channel original programming
Australian comedy television series
2013 Australian television series debuts
2013 Australian television series endings
Australian television series based on American television series